General Stone may refer to:

Charles B. Stone III (1904–1992), U.S. Air Force lieutenant general
Charles P. Stone (1915–2012), U.S. Army major general
Charles Pomeroy Stone (1824–1887), Union Army brigadier general
Douglas M. Stone (fl. 1970s–2010s), U.S. Marine Corps major general
Howard F. Stone (born 1931), U.S. Army lieutenant general
Robert Stone (British Army officer) (1890–1974), British Army lieutenant general
Roy Stone (1836–1905), Union Army brigadier general
William S. Stone (1910–1968), U.S. Air Force major general

See also
Attorney General Stone (disambiguation)